Darcy Silveira dos Santos (born 24 May 1934), known as Canário, is a Brazilian retired footballer who played as a forward.

During nine seasons, he amassed La Liga totals of 175 matches and 45 goals, most notably while with Real Madrid and Zaragoza. He won eight major titles with the two clubs combined.

Club career
Born in Rio de Janeiro, Canário played for Olaria Atlético Clube and America Football Club in his country. In 1959, he moved to Spain where he would remain until his retirement, starting with Real Madrid and being used mainly as a backup during his three-year spell. He appeared in five games and scored one goal for the club in the European Cup, three of those matches being in the 1959–60 edition which ended in victory.

After spending the 1962–63 season with Sevilla FC Canário switched to Real Zaragoza, going on to be part of an attacking frontline that was dubbed Los Magníficos (The Magnificent) and also included Carlos Lapetra, Marcelino, Eleuterio Santos and Juan Manuel Villa – he acted as right half in the team's formation. He reached four Copa del Rey finals with the Aragonese during his stint, winning the tournament twice.

Canário retired at the end of the 1968–69 campaign at the age of 33, after helping RCD Mallorca promote from Segunda División. He subsequently settled in Zaragoza.

International career
Canário won seven caps for Brazil, all in 1956. Barred by Garrincha, however, he never attended any major international tournament.

Honours

Club
Real Madrid
La Liga: 1960–61, 1961–62
Copa del Generalísimo: 1961–62
European Cup: 1959–60
Intercontinental Cup: 1960

Zaragoza
Copa del Generalísimo: 1963–64, 1965–66
Inter-Cities Fairs Cup: 1963–64

Country
Brazil
Taça do Atlântico: 1956
Taça Oswaldo Cruz: 1956

References

External links

1934 births
Living people
Brazilian emigrants to Spain
Naturalised citizens of Spain
Footballers from Rio de Janeiro (city)
Brazilian footballers
Association football forwards
America Football Club (RJ) players
La Liga players
Segunda División players
Real Madrid CF players
Sevilla FC players
Real Zaragoza players
RCD Mallorca players
UEFA Champions League winning players
Brazil international footballers
Brazilian expatriate footballers
Expatriate footballers in Spain
Brazilian expatriate sportspeople in Spain